The Lloyd C.I was a reconnaissance aircraft produced in Austria-Hungary shortly before and during the First World War, and which formed the basis for a number of other closely related types.

Design and development
The C.1 was the Lloyd company's own design, but reflected the DFW designs that Lloyd had previously been building under licence, in particular, in its swept-back, "Pfeil" ("arrow")-style  wings. Apart from this feature, it was a conventional biplane design for its day, with staggered wings of unequal span and accommodation for the pilot and observer in tandem, open cockpits. The fuselage was built from welded steel tube, and was covered in fabric. A small load of bombs could be carried internally, to be released by the observer.

The type was demonstrated at the 1914 Vienna air meet, piloted by Lloyd founder Oblt Heinrich Bier. On the first day of flying (21 June), he used it to set two altitude records, one for a pilot and single passenger (6,170 m or 20,237 ft) and one for pilot and two passengers (5,440 m or 17,843 ft), also winning the altitude competition for the meet.

Operators

Austro-Hungarian Imperial and Royal Aviation Troops

Specifications

References

Further reading

 
 
 
 
 

Lloyd aircraft
1910s Austro-Hungarian military reconnaissance aircraft
Single-engined tractor aircraft
Biplanes
Aircraft first flown in 1913